The Type 332 Frankenthal-class minehunter is a class of German minehunters. The ships are built of non-magnetic steel. Hull, machinery and superstructure of this class is similar to the original Type 343 , but the equipment differs.

In the beginning of 2019, the Indonesian Navy ordered two minehunters based on a modified Frankenthal-class with a length of 62 metres.

List of ships
All active German ships are currently stationed in Kiel at the Baltic Sea. M1058, M1059, M1062, M1065 and M1069 are part of the 3. Minensuchgeschwader (3. mine sweeper squadron). The others belong to 5. Minensuchgeschwader. M1060 Weiden was sold to United Arab Emirates in 2006. As the German Navy closed the naval base at Olpenitz, all ships were relocated to Kiel and their squadrons incorporated into the Einsatzflottille 1 (Flotilla 1).

Incidents
On 21 February 2007, Grömitz ran onto a reef in the Floro fjord while on tour in western Norway and remained stranded in a spectacular way until being salvaged.

In October 2018, the Iranian-backed Yemeni rebel group Ansar Allah released a video which included images that confirmed it sank one of the UAE Navy's Frankenthal class mine-countermeasures vessels in July 2017 in Al-Mukha. The video identified the vessel as Al-Qasnah and said it was attacked on 29 July 2017, which corresponds to a claim it made at the time that it had attacked an Emirati warship with a "suitable weapon".

Gallery

References

External links

 naval-technology.com

 

 
Minehunters of the United Arab Emirates Navy